

Imperial German Navy seaplanes numbers 1105 and 1106 were the only examples of a unique design produced for the navy's flying service during the First World War. They were unarmed biplanes of conventional configuration with staggered wings of unequal span. The empennage included a sizable ventral fin. Intended as training aircraft, the pilot and instructor sat in tandem, open cockpits. The undercarriage consisted of twin pontoons. The interplane strut arrangement was remarkable for its day, consisting of N-struts and V-struts without any rigging wires.

These machines were supplied to the naval base at Putzig at the end of 1917.

Specifications

Notes

References
 

 
 
 

1910s German military trainer aircraft
1105
Floatplanes
Single-engined tractor aircraft
Biplanes
Aircraft first flown in 1917